Gilia tricolor (bird's-eyes, bird's-eye gilia, tricolor gilia) is an annual flowering plant in the phlox family (Polemoniaceae).

Range and habitat
It is native to the Central Valley and foothills of the Sierra Nevada and Coast Ranges in California. Its native habitats include open, grassy plains and slopes below .

Description

Growth pattern

Leaves and stems

Inflorescence and fruit
Flowers have 5 green sepals and 5 bell-shaped fused petals, which are blue-violet at the end, descending to purple spots over yellow throats, hence the three for "tri".

Uses and ecological interactions

Subspecies
Gilia tricolor ssp. diffusa (Congd.) Mason & A. Grant 
Gilia tricolor ssp. tricolor Benth.

Gallery

References

External links

Jepson Manual Treatment - Gilia tricolor

tricolor
Endemic flora of California
Flora of the Sierra Nevada (United States)
Natural history of the Central Valley (California)
Natural history of the California Coast Ranges
Garden plants of North America
Flora without expected TNC conservation status